John Angarrack is a Cornish nationalist who campaigns for greater recognition of Cornish identity and is a self-published author on Cornish affairs. His campaign to revive Cornish culture and language featured in a 2005 article in the European edition of Time Magazine.

Angarrack was one of the founder members of Cornwall 2000, an organisation based in Bodmin, Cornwall. The group lobbied the UK government over the specific exclusion of the Cornish from the Framework Convention for the Protection of National Minorities.
They were, however, unsuccessful in raising sufficient funds to take matters to court, and the campaign was dropped.

His self-published books are:
Breaking the chains: propaganda, censorship, deception and the manipulation of public opinion in Cornwall, Camborne: Cornish Stannary Publications, 1999. 
Our future is history: identity, law and the Cornish question, Padstow: Independent Academic Press, 2002. 
Scat t’larrups?, published on 15 May 2008 as a follow-up to Breaking the Chains and Our Future is History, concerning police counter-terrorism activities in Cornwall during 2007.

See also

Cornish self-government movement
Cornish Foreshore Case

References

Writers from Cornwall
History of Cornwall
Cornish culture
Cornish nationalists
Living people
Year of birth missing (living people)
British male writers